The Most Eminent Order of Islam Brunei, also translated as The Most Illustrious Islamic Religious Order of the State of Brunei, is an order of Brunei. It was established on 1 August 1968 by Sultan Hassanal Bolkiah for service in the propagation, preservation and strengthening of the Islamic religion.

The order consists of five classes:

Recipients

Frist Class 

 1984 – Abdul Aziz Juned – State Mufti

Second Class 

 2022 – Dennie Abdullah – Assistant Mufti Ifta

Third Class 

 2010 – Bahrom Bahar – Deputy Minister of Religious Affairs
 2022 – Bahrin Alias – Chief Registrar of the Syariah Appeal Court

References 

Orders, decorations, and medals of Brunei
Awards established in 1968
1968 establishments in Brunei